Charles "Chuck" Pandolph, Sr. (1924–1973) was an American bobsledder who competed from the early 1950s to the early 1960s. He won a silver medal in the four-man event at the 1961 FIBT World Championships in Lake Placid, New York.

A native of Saranac Lake, New York, Pandolph also competed in two Winter Olympics, earning his best finish of sixth in the four-man event at Innsbruck in 1964.

After retiring from bobsled, Pandolph ran a bar in Saranac Lake called "Chuck's Bar". He was married with a son, Chuck, Jr. His grandson, Corey (born 1971), is best known for the online comic Barkeater Lake.

Pandolph died in 1973. He also served in the United States Marine Corps during World War II and was a police officer during his life.

References

Adirondack Daily Enterprise article featuring Pandolph's son Chuck, Jr. and his grandson, Corey – Accessed August 27, 2007.
Barkeater Lake official website
Bobsleigh four-man world championship medalists since 1930
History of the Sarnac Lake, New York bobsled club featuring Pandolph
Pandolph (left) in action at the 1952 Winter Olympics in Oslo
Pandolph (rear) in action at the 1961 FIBT World Championships in Lake Placid
Wallenchinsky, David (1984). "Bobsled". In The Complete Book of the Olympics: 1896–1980. New York: Penguin Books. pp. 559, 561.

1924 births
1973 deaths
American male bobsledders
United States Marine Corps personnel of World War II
American police officers
Bobsledders at the 1952 Winter Olympics
Bobsledders at the 1964 Winter Olympics
People from Saranac Lake, New York
United States Marines
Olympic bobsledders of the United States
20th-century American people